MESD is a gene that encodes the protein mesoderm development LRP chaperone (MESD). MESD may also refer to:
 Marvell–Elaine School District
 Moriarty-Edgewood School District
 Multnomah Education Service District